This article is about the political views and activities of the German sociologist Max Weber.

Weber described himself as a left-wing liberal. An example of his 19th-century liberal views is staunch nationalism based on classical republicanism, and that a nation with freedom for individuals is maintained by the virtues and character of its citizens. He also had a strong belief in the benefits of capitalism. Weber's assertion that capitalism had deep Christian origins was, ultimately, a political defense of the market system. His work stands in sharp contrast to socialists like Werner Sombart or RH Tawney, who argued that capitalism was fundamentally un-Christian.

Nationalism
Weber started his career as a German celebrity in 1894. As a result of his authoritative study of the so-called Ostflucht, he had a major influence on German policy towards the Germanisation of eastern Germany. He proposed closing the border to Polish workers from Russia and Austria-Hungary in his speech at the Fifth Evangelical Social Congress in 1894. He feared that Germany would eventually lose these eastern territories. He advocated the recolonisation of empty lands on the large estates of the Prussian Junkers by German settlers from the west, who would start small farms. The congress was mainly against Weber's demands because it supported the Prussian Junkers, but Weber influenced his friends and allies, including the pastor Friedrich Naumann, who later became an influential politician and one of the founders of the liberal Deutsche Demokratische Partei after World War I.

In 1905, Weber changed his mind. He was impressed by the attitude of the Russian liberal party, which wanted to change Russian nationalism by accepting ethnic minorities as Russians. Weber wanted the Germans to absorb other ethnic groups, especially the Poles, who should have become a part of a huge German empire. Weber thought that the only way that German culture would survive was by creating an empire. Power politics was to be the basis for defending the German culture and economy and to prevent it from becoming a powerless country like Switzerland.

Weber disliked the empty nationalist ideas of many German nationalists. He thought that power alone was not an acceptable goal, that politicians should stand for certain ideas but that they need a strong will to power to win. This idea of the will to power was derived from Nietzsche, who was very popular in the Germany of the 1890s. Nietzsche's conception of will to power could be interpreted both individually and culturally; Weber borrowed the cultural and communal sense as a will to power to make a collective entity (like Germany) stronger. Weber wanted Germany to strengthen its economy by creating a huge empire. He was afraid of the huge world population that would lead to German unemployment in the long run and believed that the only way to support the German workers was to create an empire. He was afraid that an end would come to economic expansion and that countries would protect their own economy with tariff barriers. He did not foresee the technological advances and the profits of international trade for the national economy in the twentieth century.

Class
Weber wanted to end the rule of the German nobility. He despised the red scare of the middle classes, because the middle classes let the nobility rule. In his opinion, the socialist parties were harmless, because they would turn into middle classes in due time. The nobility was only holding Germany back from becoming a major power in the world. In his opinion, which he expressed in the media and his politics, the middle classes should have united against the aristocracy. This led to a lot of dismay in right wing Germany. Weber was against the student fraternities which idolised military ranks. He wanted to stop the agrarian lobby damaging the regulations in the stock exchange.  He was especially against the buying of titles and noble land by the upper bourgeoisie. Weber wanted unlimited economic growth. Not military ranks, but ability and talent should be important for one's prospects. He believed that money should be put into a company and not wasted in an unproductive piece of land. Weber feared the inefficiency of the economy in Roman Catholic, non-puritanical countries and was afraid that Germany would become like Austria: Verösterreicherung Deutschlands.

The First World War
Weber was against the German annexation plans during the First World War, but he was also against a dishonourable peace. He did not believe that Germany could dominate the ethnic minorities after winning the war, but that Germany should work together with German-dominated nations and make them enthusiastic about German imperialism.

Weber wrote a series of newspaper articles in 1917, entitled "Parliament and Government in a Re-constructed Germany." These articles called for democratic reforms to the 1871 constitution of the German Empire.

Weber argued that Germany's political problems were essentially a problem of leadership. Otto von Bismarck had created a constitution that preserved his own power, but limited the ability of another powerful leader to succeed him, because of the limited experience of the political establishment with decision-making. In January 1919, Weber's brother was a founding member of the German Democratic Party.

Democracy and socialism

Weber advocated democracy as a means for selecting strong leaders. He viewed democracy as a form of charismatic leadership where the "demagogue imposes his will on the masses." For this reason, the European left is often critical of Weber for, albeit unwittingly, "preparing the intellectual groundwork for the leadership position of Adolf Hitler."

His view on the Social Democratic Party was different. He thought that the Social Democrats would become liberals after a while and get rid of their revolutionary ideals. Weber wanted to make the working classes enthusiastic about Germany and German imperialism, but later on he realized that this was impossible. Later on he changed his mind and realized that the imperial expansion of Germany was not in the interest of the working classes and only strengthened the power of the German establishment. Only the middle classes could make Germany into a huge empire. Weber wanted to unify Germany and to give the German working classes co-responsibility in the German government, but not out of an ideal of equality. He was against compassion. He wanted to create responsibility. Making an end to capitalism and enlarging of the bureaucracy would only lead to more enslavement of the workers. The only possible way for salvation would be the capitalist system and the application of new techniques. Weber openly supported strikes and labour unions, while right-wing Germans were very opposed to this.

Weber was very opposed to the conservatives that tried to hold back the democratic liberation of the working classes. Weber further dismayed the left when one of his students, Carl Schmitt (1888-1985), incorporated Weber's theories into a corpus of Nazi legal propaganda. Weber's personal and professional letters show considerable disgust for the anti-semitism of his day. It is doubtful that Weber would have supported the Nazis, had he lived long enough to see their doings.

Conservatism
Weber was very critical of German conservatives and the German emperor. Before the First World War, he believed that William II was a weak leader, who, with the conservatives, was destroying Germany's diplomatic position. The 1908 Daily Telegraph interview of William II, especially, was a great disappointment in his view. During the First World War, Weber was very critical of the German government. He thought that the right-wing Alldeutscher Verband and the German army leaders were making Germany lose the war. He was against the undemocratic views of the right, which alienated the working class and resulted in strikes and revolution. He was opposed to unlimited submarine warfare, which resulted in a declaration of war from the United States.

Weber was afraid of too much bureaucracy. In 1912, he heard that officials of the government were working together with officials of large corporate companies. Weber wanted to create a large, left-wing, political party combining social democrats and left-wing liberals to counter the bureaucratic threat. The social democrats were willing to talk with Weber, as they were eager to lose their isolation in the German society and politics. The plan failed because very few liberals prepared to help   Weber.

Ending the war
Weber was opposed to the  majority of the German parliament, which was for peace negotiations, and he strongly advocated continuing the war in many newspaper articles. At the same time, the right-wing, supported by the army, was agitating against the parliament's decision. When he found that peace was requested because of the near collapse of Austria, which had been kept secret from the press, he became enraged, for the army had known about the coming collapse of Austria. Weber strongly denounced the German emperor and the German army and advocated peace in a speech at a mass meeting in Munich accompanied by a social-democratic speaker. This speech led to sympathy among socialists for Weber.

Weber openly advocated resistance to the allies in 1918. He hoped that the battle would go on until the whole of Germany was occupied, and wanted to defend the eastern cities of Thorn, Danzig and Reichenberg against the Poles and the Czechs. He tried to win over the working classes who wanted to end the war and hoped for international revolution. Weber was against the revolution of 1918 because he feared that a strong right-wing reaction would follow. He tactically called himself a socialist, but the revolting workers regarded him as old-fashioned. Social democratic president Friedrich Ebert of Germany wanted him as Minister of the Interior in November 1918, but he later chose Hugo Preuss. Ebert then wanted Weber as ambassador in Vienna, but Weber's anti-government attitude in speeches made this impossible. In early 1919, he lost a possible seat in the German parliament because of his alienation from the revolution in 1918.

Weber was a member of the German delegation during the peace negotiations over the  Treaty of Versailles. Weber at first wanted Germany not to sign the treaty, but he feared that it would make things only worse for Germany after a while. For months, he was unsure whether or not signing was a better decision.

References
Mommsen, Wolfgang J.;, Max Weber and German Politics, University of Chicago Press, 1990, 
Mommsen, Wolfgang J.; The Political and Social Theory of Max Weber, University of Chicago Press, 1992, 

Max Weber